Celtic Wedding is an album of traditional Breton music performed by the Irish band The Chieftains. The album features guest performances by Breton artists Nolwen Monjarret, Bernard Pichard, Alain Guerton and Michel Bertae. Nolwen Monjarret later appeared on the Chieftains' 1991 album, The Bells of Dublin, performing "A Breton Carol" with the band.

The album's liner notes state that the music was selected from a publication entitled Tonioù Breizh-Izel (Traditional Tunes from Lower Brittany), which contains over 3,000 tunes collected by Polig Monjarret, who collaborated with Paddy Moloney in choosing the tunes for the album. The original album's cover features a painting by the Scottish painter Alexander Goudie of a country fair attended by people and animals. This was later changed in more recent reprints to a cover photo of windblown rocks. Celtic Wedding was nominated for a Grammy Award in 1986.

The making of the album was sponsored by Brittany Ferries.

Track listing
All songs traditional. Descriptions from the album's liner notes.

Side one
"Dans Mod Koh a Vaod" (3:30) Old-fashioned dance
"A Breton Carol" (3:41)
"Dans-Tro Fisel" (4:06) Dance from the Fisel country  
"Marches" (4:09) From the Vannes country
"Dans Bro-Leon" (2:28) Dance and song from the Leon country
"Heuliadenn Tonioù Breizh-Izel" (6:57) A medley in which each member of the band plays a tune of his own choice

Side two
"Ev Chistr 'Ta, Laou!" (1:56) Cider-drinking song
"Jabadaw" (3:03) Dance from Breton Cornwall
"Celtic Wedding" (20:11) A medley of song and dance describing the famous ancient Breton ceremony

Personnel
Derek Bell – harp, tiompán, oboe, organ
Martin Fay – fiddle, bones
Seán Keane – fiddle
Kevin Conneff – bodhrán, vocals
Matt Molloy – flute, tin whistle
Paddy Moloney – uilleann pipes, tin whistle
Nolwenn Monjarret - vocals
Bernard Pichard - bombarde
Alain Guerton - bombarde, biniou
Michel Bertae - bombarde, biniou

References 
The Chieftains Official Website Discography https://web.archive.org/web/20110723095602/http://www.thechieftains.com/discography/disc_celticwedding.asp

1987 albums
The Chieftains albums
RCA Records albums